Pterostylis porrecta is a species of greenhood orchid endemic to New Zealand. Flowering plants have spreading, grass-like leaves on the flowering stem and a single small, transparent white and green flower with the lateral sepals held close to horizontally in front of the flower.

Description
Pterostylis porrecta is a terrestrial, perennial, deciduous, herb with an underground tuber. The flower leans forward and the dorsal sepal and petals are fused, forming a hood or "galea" over the column. There is a wide gap between the galea and the lateral sepals which have long, tapering tips, spread apart from each other and held almost horizontally in front of the flower. The labellum is gently curved, greenish with a pink tip and does not protrude through the sinus between the lateral sepals. Flowering occurs in December and January.

Taxonomy and naming
Pterostylis porrecta was first formally described in 1997 by David Jones, Brian Molloy and Mark Clements and the description was published in The Orchadian. The specific epithet (porrecta) is a Latin word meaning "spread out" or "stretched.

Distribution and habitat
The shrimp-flowered greenhood usually grows in deep shade in forest and scrub. There are scattered populations on both the North and South Islands.

Conservation status
Pterostylis porrecta is classed as "at risk – naturally uncommon" under the New Zealand Threat Classification System.

References

porrecta
Orchids of New Zealand
Plants described in 1997